Riverworld is a television film that had been intended to be a four-hour television miniseries released on the Syfy channel on April 18, 2010. Based on the Riverworld books by Philip José Farmer, this miniseries is a reboot of the cancelled Sci-Fi Channel Riverworld television series, of which only the pilot episode was produced.

Riverworld stars Tahmoh Penikett, Laura Vandervoort, Jeananne Goossen, Alan Cumming, Mark Deklin, and Peter Wingfield. It is produced by Reunion Pictures, an award-winning Canadian-based production company. It is written by Robert Hewitt Wolfe and directed by Stuart Gillard.

Plot
War reporter Matt Ellman is in Singapore with his girlfriend Jessie, to whom he is about to propose marriage. However, before he proposes, both of them are killed in a terrorist attack by a suicide bomber. Afterwards, they find themselves on a strange planet called Riverworld, where everyone who has ever lived on Earth has been reborn along the banks of a seemingly endless river. Riverworld functions as a sort of purgatory for deceased human beings to get a second chance.

In this world, Matt finds several of his deceased friends as well as historical figures, some of whom are his allies and others who are antagonistic. The antagonists include explorer Richard Francis Burton (who in the books was the main protagonist) and Francisco Pizarro, the Conquistador who conquered the Incas. The friendlier people include American author Samuel Clemens (also known as Mark Twain) and Tomoe Gozen, a 12th-century Japanese warrior from the time of the Genpei War married to Minamoto no Yoshinaka. Along with the other heroes, Matt soon discovers that Riverworld has a deeper purpose and is controlled by otherworldly caretakers who are engaged in a civil war.

Cast

Caretakers 
The caretakers appear as blue-skinned robe-clad figures who watch over the humans. They were the beings who created Riverworld and are occasionally described as "demons". The caretakers are mostly divided between two separate factions: the Salvationists (those who wish to destroy Riverworld to move on to bigger and better things) and the Second Chancers (those who wish to protect Riverworld). There is a civil war between these two groups and their leaders. The leader of the Salvationists thinks that his opponent is weak and does not see the bigger picture, while the leader of the Second Chancers views her enemy as a selfish traitor who only wishes to benefit himself. Both groups seek out their own champions to accomplish their goals, although it is strictly forbidden to do so because their laws state that they are not allowed to directly interfere with humans.

Nature of the river 
Riverworld consists of an endless, or seemingly endless, river. In Riverworld, every human is effectively immortal as they are forever young and healthy (regardless of their age at the time of their Earthly death), can recover very fast from wounds, and are resistant to diseases. However, they can die, although they will always be resurrected somewhere else along the river at various different times. Some people use this for travel, calling it the "suicide express". Every person is also given a solid metal bracelet called a "grail band" for food and drinks, with the exception of champions who are sent into Riverworld without them as sort of a sign of being free from the bonds of Riverworld. It is later revealed that this also keeps the caretakers from tracking them, keeping the humans involved in the civil war more mobile and invisible to the opposing side. The river also has a "source" which is not only the start of the river, but also the entirety of Riverworld; it appears as The Dark Tower, which is similar to the name of one of the books in the Riverworld novels, The Dark Design.

Transportation 
The two main forms of transportation are the riverboat and the zeppelin. The riverboat Not-for-Hire was built by Samuel Clemens, while the zeppelin was built by the man who built the Hindenburg and is called Herumfurzeln  (which means in German to fart around). Both use what is suspected by one of the characters to be a fusion power source.

References

External links 
 

Syfy original programming
2010s American television miniseries
Riverworld
Fiction about purgatory
2010s Canadian television miniseries